Slavonice is a town in Jindřichův Hradec District in the South Bohemian Region of the Czech Republic. It has about 2,300 inhabitants. The town centre is well preserved and is protected by law as an urban monument reservation.

Administrative parts
Villages and hamlets of Kadolec, Maříž, Mutišov, Rubašov, Stálkov and Vlastkovec are administrative parts of Slavonice.

Geography
It lies on the border with Austria and is adjacent to the municipality of Waldkirchen an der Thaya. Despite administratively being a part of the South Bohemian Region, the town lies in the historical land of Moravia.

The Slavonický Stream flows through the town and feed several ponds in the municipal territory.

History

Slavonice was founded in the 12th century. The first written mention is from 1260. The settlement and later a market village slowly developed into a fortified town. From the 13th century, the underground system was built, which served as drainage and town's defense system. In the 14th century, Slavonice extended to the west (today's Míru Square) and to the east (today's Horní Square).

At the end of the 15th century, ponds began to be established in the area. Slavonice reached its greatest prosperity in the 16th century, when it was an important town on the trade route from Prague to Vienna, which brought it great wealth. During these times, it gained its Renaissance look. When the route was relocated, the town's source of wealth dried up, which contributed to the preservation of a unique set of Renaissance houses.

The town and the surrounding countryside were lightly fortified in the period leading up to the World War II. Some of these small bunker complexes have been repaired and refurbished, with mock battles of Wehrmacht and Czechoslovak forces taking place in summer. The area and defences were never used against the Third Reich, being settled by a German-speaking majority, as the town and region had to be surrendered to the Third Reich following the Munich Agreement.

The original German-speaking population was expelled in June 1945 following the World War II. 

Being so close to the Austrian border, Slavonice was heavily affected by the creation of the Iron Curtain during the period of communism. The hamlet of Maříž was emptied of its inhabitants during the communist era in an effort to prevent people from living anywhere near the border with non-communist Austria. After the Velvet Revolution and the fall of communism, Maříž was recolonized by ceramics artists, and Slavonice has once again become a popular destination for Czech tourists and artists.

Demographics

Transport
There is the road border crossing with Austria Slavonice / Fratres.

Slavonice is the final station on the Telč–Dačice–Slavonice railway line.

Sights

The town has a traditional medieval Renaissance town centre. Cellar vaults, facades of houses with typical gables derived from the Italian Renaissance and a guild rooms with murals have been preserved. The rich sgraffito decoration of the houses is also typical, including complex figural scenes.

Church of the Assumption of the Virgin Mary is located between the two town squares. Its tower was built in 1503–1549 and is one of the symbols of the town. It is accessible to the public as a lookout tower.

Church of Saint John the Baptist was built in the 13th or 14th century. It has a facade decorated with sgraffito from the end of the 16th century. Today it serves to cultural purposes. Church of the Holy Cross is a cemetery church from 1702. Outside the urban area, there is the pilgrimage Church of Corpus Cristi, which was built originally in the 13th century and renewed after it was burned down during the Hussite Wars.

The Gothic underground system is preserved to this day. About  of tunnels are open to the visitors. Part of the town fortifications have also been preserved, including two gates, two bastions and several fragments of town walls.

In popular culture
The town was used by Jaromil Jireš as a location for his film Valerie and Her Week of Wonders (1970).

Twin towns – sister cities

Slavonice is twinned with:
 Bogen, Germany
 Dobersberg, Austria
 Stakčín, Slovakia

References

External links

Pictures and commentary from a visitor

Cities and towns in the Czech Republic
Czech Renaissance
Populated places in Jindřichův Hradec District
Austria–Czech Republic border crossings